The 2017 Ando Securities Open was a professional tennis tournament played on outdoor hard courts. It was the third edition of the tournament and was part of the 2017 ITF Women's Circuit. It took place in Tokyo, Japan, on 6–12 November 2017.

Singles main draw entrants

Seeds 

 1 Rankings as of 30 October 2017.

Other entrants 
The following players received a wildcard into the singles main draw:
  Yuki Naito
  Makoto Ninomiya
  Kyōka Okamura
  Himari Sato

The following players received entry from the qualifying draw:
  Naomi Cheong
  Tori Kinard
  Mei Yamaguchi
  Aiko Yoshitomi

Champions

Singles

 Zhang Shuai def.  Mihaela Buzărnescu, 6–4, 6–0

Doubles
 
 Rika Fujiwara /  Yuki Naito def.  Eri Hozumi /  Junri Namigata, 6–1, 6–3

External links 
 2017 Ando Securities Open at ITFtennis.com
 Official website

2017 ITF Women's Circuit
2017 in Japanese tennis